{{DISPLAYTITLE:C14H15NO2S}}
The molecular formula C14H15NO2S (molar mass: 261.34 g/mol, exact mass: 261.0823 u) may refer to:

 SKF-89,145
 Cyclohexylthiophthalimide (CTP)

Molecular formulas